Elena Vorobey (born 5 June 1967 in Brest, Belarus) is a Russian actor and stand-up comedian.

In 2012 she was awarded the title of Merited Artist of the Russian Federation (Заслуженный артист Российской Федерации)

References

External links
Official website archived on 27 January 2020

1967 births
21st-century Russian actresses
Living people
Russian activists against the 2022 Russian invasion of Ukraine
Russian stand-up comedians

Russian women comedians